Lepas pectinata, the small goose barnacle, is a species of goose barnacle in the family Lepadidae.

References

External links

 

Barnacles
Crustaceans described in 1793